Basem Khandakji (Arabic: باسم خندقجي), a Palestinian writer, journalist, and prisoner, was born in 1983. He studied at An-Najah National University in the Department of Journalism and Information. He was arrested by the Israeli occupation forces on November 2, 2004, and was sentenced to life imprisonment. He has published several novels, poems, and studies while he is inside Israeli prison, and his latest novel "The Eclipse of Baderddine" was published in December 2018. Some of his works have been translated into French.

Personal life 
Basem Muhammad Salih Adeeb Khandakji was born on December 22, 1983. He studied in Nablus Governorate Schools. Later, he joined An-Najah National University to study in the Department of Journalism and Media. He witnessed the First Intifada which affected his political orientations; therefore, he joined the ranks of the former Communist Palestinian People's Party when he was only 15 years old at the time. Khandakji was arrested on November 2, 2004, by Israeli forces, after the Carmel Market operation, which three Israelis were killed and more than 50 were wounded. Even though Khandakji did not carry out military activity during the operation, he was sentenced on June 7, 2005, to three life sentence and in the testimony of the International Red Cross, he was sentenced to life. In addition to being accused of participating in the operation, the Israeli authorities demanded that he compensate the families of those who were killed in the operation with an amount of $11.6 million. The prisoner Bassem is thirty-five years old, of which he spent 15 years in the prison and currently is in the "Hydrim" prison.

Career 
Khandakji began his journey of writing inside the prison and he published several books, novels, and poetry collections. His first book titled "Drafts of the Homeland Lover" which consist of 10 articles that talk about the Palestinian concerns. He also published "Thus Humanity is Dying" which is about the experience of the Palestinian concerns. Khandakji also published a poetry collection entitle (A know on the Walls of the Place). His latest novel "The Eclipse Baderddine" was published in December 2018 which is a historical novel that talks about the Sufi hero Badreddine on his rebellion journey, making him a scholar and a pole of Sufism in his time.

Works 

 Tuqus Al Mara Al Ula, 2009
 Anfas Qasia Lailya, 2013
 Narjas Al 'Azlaa, 2014
 Khosuf Baderddine, 2018

References 

Palestinian poets
Palestinian novelists
21st-century Palestinian writers
1983 births
Living people
An-Najah National University alumni